Langah may refer to:
 Langah Sultanate, a Kingdom that ruled Western Punjab from Multan.
 Langah, Chakwal, a settlement in Punjab, Pakistan
 Sucha Singh Langah, Indian politician from Punjab

See also 
 Langa (disambiguation)
 Langha